Knowledge Musona (born 21 June 1990) is a Zimbabwean professional footballer who plays as a left winger or forward for Al-Tai in the Saudi Professional League, and captains the Zimbabwe national team. Previously, he has played senior football in South Africa, Belgium and Germany.

Personal life
Knowledge Musona hails from Norton, Mashonaland West and attended Lord Malvern High School in Harare. His younger brother Walter Musona is also a professional footballer.

Club career
Musona made his debut for Hoffenheim as a substitute against SC Freiburg in a 3–1 win and scored his first goal in a 2–1 DFB-Pokal win over Köln on 25 October 2011. On 18 May 2012, it was announced that he would join Augsburg on a one-year loan for the upcoming season.

In July 2013, he left Germany and moved to South African side Kaizer Chiefs on a loan deal. He scored eight goals in 19 league matches, including a vital goal which sent his team into the last 16 of the Nedbank Cup. Musona scored a hat trick in a 3–0 first-round, second-leg CAF Champions League victory over Liga Muculmana in Maputo on 6 March, progressing to the next round of the competition on a 7–0 aggregate scoreline after winning 4–0 at Moses Mabhida Stadium. Musona suffered an ankle sprain in a 2–0 win over AS Vita Club in the CAF Champions League on 29 March 2014 where they lost 3–2 on aggregate. Musona ended the season with 16 goals in 25 starts in all competitions. He attracted interest from clubs in Belgium, Germany and Roda of the Netherlands. On 5 August, Musona started training with La Liga club, Granada.

On 18 December 2014, Musona signed for Belgian club Oostende, effective 1 January 2015, with the player signing a two-and-a-half-year contract for an undisclosed fee.
His agent Paschalis Tountouris stated that this move was the ideal step to revive his career. He joined Andile Jali at the Belgian club. He made his Belgian Pro League debut on 17 January 2015 in a 7–1 home defeat to K.V. Kortrijk. He was subbed off in the 67th minute, being replaced by Fernando Canesin. He scored his first competitive goal for the club on 21 February 2015 in a 3–1 home defeat to Charleroi in the league. His goal, assisted by Elimane Coulibaly, was scored in the 77th minute.

In May 2018, Musona moved to RSC Anderlecht, signing a four-year deal. This came after reported interest from another Belgian side, Standard Liège. He made his league debut for the club on the opening day of the season, coming on for Landry Dimata in the 86th minute of Anderlecht's 4–1 away victory over K.V. Kortrijk. He scored his first competitive goal for the club on 26 August 2018 in a 2–1 away defeat to Club Brugge. His goal, assisted by Ivan Santini, was scored in the 19th minute and levelled the scores at one.

In January 2019, Musona was loaned out to Lokeren until the end of the 2018–19 season. He made his league debut for the club on 19 January 2019, playing all ninety minutes of a 4–1 away defeat to Eupen. He scored his first league goal for the club on 9 February 2019 in a 2–1 home victory over Royal Antwerp. His goal, assisted by Marko Mirić, was scored in the 32nd minute.

International career
Musona made his national team debut in a friendly against South Africa on 3 March 2010. He is often considered to be one of the finest strikers to ever come out of Zimbabwe. At the 2017 African Cup of Nations, he scored a goal against Tunisia, beating two defenders and smashing the ball beyond the goalkeeper. On 11 June 2017, he scored a hat trick to join other Zimbabwean hat trick heroes like the legendary Peter Ndlovu and Vitalis Takawira. Musona announced his retirement from international football in 2022.

Career statistics

Club

International

International goals

Scores and results list Zimbabwe's goal tally first.

References

External links

1990 births
Living people
Sportspeople from Mashonaland West Province
Zimbabwean footballers
Zimbabwean expatriate footballers
Zimbabwe international footballers
Association football forwards
Kaizer Chiefs F.C. players
TSG 1899 Hoffenheim players
Bundesliga players
Expatriate soccer players in South Africa
Expatriate footballers in Germany
Expatriate footballers in Belgium
Expatriate footballers in Saudi Arabia
Zimbabwean expatriate sportspeople in South Africa
Zimbabwean expatriate sportspeople in Germany
Zimbabwean expatriate sportspeople in Belgium
Zimbabwean expatriate sportspeople in Saudi Arabia
FC Augsburg players
K.V. Oostende players
R.S.C. Anderlecht players
K.S.C. Lokeren Oost-Vlaanderen players
K.A.S. Eupen players
Al-Tai FC players
Belgian Pro League players
Saudi Professional League players
2017 Africa Cup of Nations players
2019 Africa Cup of Nations players
2021 Africa Cup of Nations players
People from Norton, Zimbabwe